Suellen Evans (April 1, 1944 – June 30, 1965) was a college student taking summer courses at the University of North Carolina at Chapel Hill (UNC) who was stabbed and slashed to death at the campus' Coker Arboretum when she fought off a rape attempt. The killer has never been identified, and investigations have gone cold over the years, the murder having a lasting impact on the community and local police force. Renewed interest was brought into the investigation of Suellen's murder by more recent murders of female co-eds at the same university, specifically Eve Carson and Faith Hedgepath, and the police are asking the public for information leading to answers and even the killer(s) responsible.

Background
Suellen Evans was originally from Mooresville, North Carolina, her father Glenn, then working as a postman. She primarily attended Catawba College in Salisbury, majoring in Home Economics. Suellen was taking summer classes at UNC to get the remaining credits she needed for her acceptance at the University of North Carolina at Greensboro. She was remembered to have quickly made friends during her stay in the city.

Murder and Investigation
Shortly after midday, on Friday, July 30, 1965, Suellen just left class and went to speak with a friend, and later one of her professors. She then proceeded to take a detour through the Coker Arboretum to get to her dorms, as she was packing up for a trip back to her hometown. It was a path Suellen was reported to have taken often. She was grabbed by an unseen assailant hiding behind the plant life where she was walking, some sources saying she spoke to the attacker. The assailant tried to rape her under a crape myrtle, but Suellen resisted. The attacker pulled out a pocket knife, stabbing her twice in the neck, once in her heart. Suellen collapsed, and the attacker fled with the weapon in hand.

Several witnesses, reports varying between at least one student or none being present, witnesses said they saw Suellen stumble to the walkway and collapse. When questioning what happened to her, she muttered her last words, "He tried to rape me. I believe I'm going to faint." As one witness tried to help her up, she fell again into a periwinkle bed. At least one responding witness ran off to get help, at least one other witness trying to resuscitate her. Suellen lost a large amount of her blood and died at the scene, age 21. The police responded within minutes, barricading the areas and ordering their bloodhounds to track scents, but the killer escaped.

Dozens of suspects were questioned in the ensuing manhunt, ranging as far as Chicago and Texas and involving university and district police under then-chief William D. Blake, as well as the state bureau. Scrapings were taken from Suellen's fingernails, and her clothes and books were sent to the bureau to check for evidence. A gardener matching the description of the suspect was questioned, but he fainted regularly during questioning and was subsequently released with little to hold him on. A janitor reported he saw a boy running out from the botanical gardens at the scene, but there was never a boy located. Suspects were often released due to having no wounds from Suellen fighting the killer off. Reports publicized at the time have stated the attacker to be black based on eyewitness accounts, but this has especially as of recent no longer been considered a popularly accepted lead and is barely reiterated in current reports.

Around 200 men volunteered to scour the gardens for the murder weapon, which came up empty. The Dean of Women urged female students to never walk alone in the arboretum. The FBI was considered for the investigation, but there were no further mentions afterward. A reward fund for information gathered by students eventually amounted to as much as today's value of 10 grand U.S.

Reignited Attention
Suellen's murder has received more attention in recent years in the wake of other young college women at UNC being murdered, most notably Eve Carson and Faith Hedgepeth, the latter of whom was also recognized as a murdered Indigenous woman hailing from the Haliwa-Saponi people. Orange County Sheriff Lindy Pendergrass spoke to local news outlets in recent reports, as he served on the force in Chapel Hill at the time of the murder. The Raleigh, North Carolina regional newspaper, The News & Observer, has published their own articles in the hopes of gaining renewed public interest in the murder of Suellen and other state cold cases. Suellen's killer remains still unidentified.

References

1965 murders in the United States
Killings in North Carolina
Deaths by stabbing in the United States
Deaths by person in North Carolina
Violence against women in the United States
Incidents of violence against women
University of North Carolina at Chapel Hill events
July 1965 events in the United States
Unsolved murders in the United States
Campus sexual assault